Simic may refer to:

Simić, a Serbian and Croatian surname
Šimić, a Croatian and Serbian surname
Simic Combine, a Magic: The Gathering faction from Ravnica
Simics, a software simulator